Wola Przybysławska  is a village in the administrative district of Gmina Garbów, within Lublin County, Lublin Voivodeship, in eastern Poland.

The village has a population of 1,600.

References

Villages in Lublin County